The LG CU575, also known as the Trax, is a GSM/UMTS mobile phone carried by AT&T Mobility.  It is designed to run on AT&T's UMTS frequencies of 850 and 1900 MHz.  The phone features a slim design similar to the Motorola RAZR series, and also features external music controls and a microSD memory card slot supporting cards up to 4 GB.  The phone is a replacement for the LG CU500.

References

External links
 LG Trax Product Page

CU575
Mobile phones introduced in 2007